Saifon Kaewsri is a Thai Paralympic swimmer. He won the bronze medal in the men's 50 metre breaststroke SB2 event at the 2000 Summer Paralympics held in Sydney, Australia.

References

External links 
 

Living people
Year of birth missing (living people)
Saifon Kaewsri
Swimmers at the 2000 Summer Paralympics
Saifon Kaewsri
Paralympic medalists in swimming
Saifon Kaewsri
Medalists at the 2000 Summer Paralympics
S4-classified Paralympic swimmers
Saifon Kaewsri